Marshall Lamar Forbes-Moore (born 6 November 1980) is a Caymanian football forward. He has represented the Cayman Islands during World Cup qualifying matches in 2006 and 2010.

References

Association football forwards
Living people
1980 births
Caymanian footballers
Cayman Islands international footballers
Latinos FC players
Expatriate soccer players in the United States
Lindsey Wilson Blue Raiders men's soccer players